The year 1913 in radio involved some significant events.

Events
 31 January – Edwin Howard Armstrong first demonstrates the employment of three-element vacuum tubes in circuits that amplify signals to stronger levels than previously thought possible and that could also generate high-power oscillations usable for radio transmission. On 29 October he applies for a United States patent covering the regenerative circuit.
 Spring – Lee de Forest utilizes the feedback principle operate a low-powered transmitter for heterodyne reception of the Federal Telegraph Company's arc transmissions.
 12 November – The International Convention for the Safety of Life at Sea is convened in London and produces a treaty requiring shipboard radio stations to be manned 24 hours a day.
 Late – Lee de Forest is acquitted of stock fraud in connection with the Radio Telephone Company in the United States.
 The Marconi Company initiates duplex transatlantic wireless communication between North America and Europe for the first time, transmitting from Marconi Towers at Louisbourg, Nova Scotia, to Letterfrack in Ireland.
 The cascade-tuning radio receiver is introduced.
 Lee de Forest publishes a description of his Audion triode detecting or amplifying vacuum tube.

Births
 25 May – Richard Dimbleby, English broadcast news presenter (died 1965)
 31 May – Peter Frankenfeld, German comedian (died 1979)
 25 June – Cyril Fletcher, English comic monologuist (died 2005)
 6 July – Gwyn Thomas, Welsh writer and broadcaster (died 1981)

Deaths
 November 6 – Sir William Henry Preece, Welsh wireless telegraph engineer (born 1834)

References

 
Radio by year